Jann Browne (born March 14, 1954) is an American country music singer. She moved to Southern California in 1978 where she performed in a number of Orange County country bars. From 1981 through 1983, before her solo career, she was a vocalist with the Western swing group Asleep at the Wheel. She has recorded four studio albums, and has charted three singles on the Hot Country Songs charts. Her highest single is the 1990s "Tell Me Why" at No. 18.  She was named "Female Entertainer of the Year", and her song "Louisville" was named "Song of the Year", by the California Country Music Association. In 1990, she was nominated for Top New Female Vocalist at the Academy of Country Music Awards, along with Daniele Alexander and Mary Chapin Carpenter, but lost to Carpenter.

Discography

Albums

Singles

Notes:
A "Mexican Wind" did not chart on Hot Country Songs, but peaked at No. 2 on Hot Country Radio Breakouts.

Music videos

References

External links
Jann Browne official site

1954 births
American women country singers
American country singer-songwriters
Asleep at the Wheel members
Country musicians from Indiana
Musicians from Anderson, Indiana
Living people
Curb Records artists
21st-century American women
Singer-songwriters from Indiana